Zuzanna Efimienko-Młotkowska (born 8 August 1989) is a Polish volleyball player. She was part of the Poland women's national volleyball team. She played with Impel Gwardia Wrocław.

Clubs
  SMS PZPS Sosnowiec (2003–2007)
  Impel Gwardia Wrocław (2007–2012)
  Imoco Volley (2012–2013)
  Atom Trefl Sopot (2013–2016)
  Metalleghe Sanitars Montichiari (2016–present)

References

1989 births
Living people
Polish women's volleyball players
People from Lubań
Universiade medalists in volleyball
Universiade bronze medalists for Poland
Medalists at the 2009 Summer Universiade